San Maurizio d'Opaglio is a comune (municipality) in the Province of Novara in the Italian region of Piedmont, located about  northeast of Turin and about  northwest of Novara.

San Maurizio d'Opaglio borders the following municipalities: Gozzano, Madonna del Sasso, Orta San Giulio, Pella, and Pogno.

References

External links
 Official website

Cities and towns in Piedmont